Abul Maal Abdul Muhith (25 January 1934 – 30 April 2022) was a Bangladeshi economist, writer, civil servant, secretary, diplomat and politician. He served as the Finance Minister of the government of Bangladesh from January 2009 until January 2019.

Early life and education
Muhith was born on 25 January 1934, to a Bengali Muslim political family in Sylhet. His father, Abu Ahmad Abdul Hafiz, a judge in profession, was one of the founders of the Sylhet branch of the All-India Muslim League and took part in the Pakistan Movement. His mother, Syeda Shahar Banu, was one of the leading women of the Bengali language movement. He was the third child in a family of fourteen children. His younger brother is AK Abdul Momen, the incumbent Minister of Foreign Affairs for Bangladesh, and his sister is Shahla Khatun, a physician and National Professor of Bangladesh.

Muhith passed the matriculation exam from Sylhet Government Pilot High School in 1949. He secured first place in his Intermediate examination in 1951 from Murari Chand College. He stood first class first in B.A. (Hons.) in English literature in 1953 from the University of Dhaka and passed his masters with credit from the same university in 1955. While in service to the government, he studied at the University of Oxford during 1957–1958. He completed his Master of Public Administration degree at Harvard University in 1964.

Early career
Muhith served as the general secretary of the central committee of the Pakistan Civil Service Association during 1960–1969. He joined the Pakistan Embassy in the United States as an Economic Counselor in 1969. In 1966, he was honoured with the Tamgha e Khidmat award by the Pakistan government. During his service as the Chief and Deputy Secretary of Pakistan Planning Commission, he made a report on the discrimination between East and West Pakistan and that was the first submitted report on that issue in Pakistan National Congress. He was the first diplomat of Washington Embassy who showed his consent in favour of Bangladesh giving up the side of Pakistan during the Independence War of 1971. He was appointed the Secretary of Planning in 1972 and Secretary of the External Resource Department of Finance and Planning Ministry in 1977.

Retirement and return
Muhith went for self-retirement in 1981 from his service and then he started his second innings of his career as the specialist of economics and development in Ford Foundation and in the International Fund for Agricultural Development (IFAD). He became Finance and Planning Minister in 1982–83. Next, he worked as the specialist of different institutions of World Bank and the United Nations. He has been a recognised figure in the World Bank, International Monetary Fund, IDB and in different organisations of United Nations. He was the visiting fellow of Princeton University in 1984 and 1985.

Muhith took oath as the Finance Minister of Bangladesh government on 6 January 2009 and in August 2009 he inaugurated the building of the Benapole Customs and Immigration Check Post.

Muhith retired from the government and from his role as a Jatiya Sangsad member for the Sylhet-1 constituency at the elections of December 2018. His younger brother AK Abdul Momen succeeded him as the constituency representative.

Personal life
Muhith was married to designer Syeda Sabia. Their daughter, Samina Muhith, is a banker and an expert in the field of monetary policy. Their elder son, Shahed Muhith, is an architect, and younger son, Samir Muhith, is a teacher.

On 5 March 2022, Muhith was taken to Green Life Hospital in Dhaka due to illness. He died on 30 April 2022 at United Hospital.

Works

 Bangladesh, emergence of a nation (1978)
 Thoughts on development administration (1981)
 American response to Bangladesh liberation war (1996)
 Bangladesh in the twenty-first century : towards an industrial society (1999)
 Issues of governance in Bangladesh (2001)
 State language movement in East Bengal, 1947-1956 (2006)
 History of Bangladesh : A Subcontinental Civilisation (2016)

Criticism
Muhith had faced criticism for his handling of the 2011 share market crash. He admitted to his mistakes in decisions related to the stock market in addition to the mistakes of the Security and Exchange Commission. Although the opposition leaders and protesting investors had called for his resignation, he refused and defended his position. He had appointed a probe committee to investigate the allegations against the Security Exchange Commission, however this also attracted criticism towards him as he consequently refused to publicly disclose the names of those accused of chicanery by this committee. Muhith became the center of a criticism after he had commented on the Hallmark money scam that the Tk 4,000 crore embezzled was a "meager amount". He later apologized for his statement.
Muhith had been criticised for consistently insulting Nobel laureate Muhammad Yunus and terming his comments as "totally rubbish" and also for saying Yunus has no integrity over the Grameen Bank issue. In September 2015, Muhith faced widespread criticisms for his remarks against the movement of public university teachers of Bangladesh seeking a separate pay scale. He later apologized for his remarks. At the same time, controversy was caused by VAT being imposed on the Bangladeshi private university education system: Muhith defended this decision.

References

1934 births
2022 deaths
People from Sylhet
Murari Chand College alumni
University of Dhaka alumni
Harvard Kennedy School alumni
Bangladeshi diplomats
20th-century Bangladeshi economists
9th Jatiya Sangsad members
10th Jatiya Sangsad members
Awami League politicians
Finance ministers of Bangladesh
Recipients of the Independence Day Award
Honorary Fellows of Bangla Academy